Broadway Scandals is a 1929 American Pre-Code musical film.

Cast
 Sally O'Neil - Mary
 Jack Egan - Ted Howard
 Carmel Myers - Valeska
 J. Barney Sherry - Le Claire
 Charles C. Wilson - Jack Lane
 Doris Dawson - Bobby
 Wild Bill Elliott - George Halloway

Songs
 "Does An Elephant Love Peanuts?"
Music and Lyrics by James F. Hanley
Sung by Jack Egan
Danced by Jack Egan and Sally O'Neill
Copyright 1929 by Shapiro, Bernstein & Co. Inc.
 "What Is Life Without Love?"
Sung by Jack Egan
Music and Lyrics by Jack Stone, Fred Thompson, & Dave Franklin
Copyright 1929 by Irving Berlin Inc.
 "Would I Love To Love You (I'd Love To)"
Sung by Jack Egan
Words and Music by Dave Dreyer and Sidney Clare
Copyright 1929 by Irving Berlin Inc.
 "Can You Read in My Eyes"Music and lyrics by Sam Coslow
 "Love's the Cause of All My Blues"Music and lyrics by Joe Trent and Charles Daniels
 "Rhythm of the Tambourine"Music and lyrics by David Franklin
 "Kickin' the Blues Away"'''
Music and lyrics by David Franklin and James F. Hanley.

ReceptionPhotoplay Magazine was unenthusiastic in its review of Broadway Scandals: "If this picture appeared six months ago, it would have looked better, for it is a late entrant in the line of love stories back of the theater curtain." Egan and Myers did well in their roles, while "Sally O'Neil tries hard."

References

External links
 
 
 A review of Broadway Scandals by The New York Times''
 

1929 musical films
1929 films
Films directed by George Archainbaud
Columbia Pictures films
American black-and-white films
American musical films
1920s American films